An illuminated procession is a procession held after dark so that lights carried by the participants form a spectacle.  The lights will commonly be of the same type, so making a candlelight procession, lantern parade or torchlight march.

Examples include the Christmas festival of Ndocciata in Italy; the Chinese Lantern Festival to celebrate the first full moon; and the daily procession of pilgrims to the grotto of Lourdes.

What is believed to be the largest and the best illuminated procession in the world is the Bridgwater Guy Fawkes Carnival held on the first Saturday of November in the town of Bridgwater, Somerset, in the UK. It is followed by a fireworks display that is unique to the town, known as squibbing. The carnival parades also take place in a variety of Somerset towns throughout November.

Torchlight marches by the Far Right

The Far-right and Nationalist groups have had a long history of torchlight marches.

During the 1930s Nazi Germany in some of its Nuremberg rallies used torchlight marches.

On 1 January 2014, Stepan Bandera's 105th birthday was celebrated by a torchlight procession of 15,000 people in the centre of Kyiv and thousands more rallied near his statue in Lviv. The march was supported by the far-right Svoboda party and some members of the center-right Batkivshchyna.

In 2017, During the Unite the Right rally that took place in Charlottesville, Virginia. a group of white nationalistsvariously numbered from "dozens" to "about 250"gathered for an unannounced (and unsanctioned by the city) march through the University of Virginia's campus. They marched towards the university's Lawn chanting Nazi and white supremacist slogans, including "White lives matter"; "You will not replace us"; and "Jews will not replace us". (The phrase "You will not replace us" has been reported by the Anti-Defamation League to "reflect the white supremacist world view that ... the white race is doomed to extinction by an alleged 'rising tide of color' purportedly controlled and manipulated by Jews".) The Nazi slogan "Blood and Soil" was also used. The group was primarily composed of white men, many of them wielding tiki torches.

In Estonia Conservative People's Party of Estonia The party's affiliated nationalist youth movement Blue Awakening is the main organizer of the annual torchlight march through Tallinn on 24 February, Independence Day of Estonia. The first Independence Day torchlight march was held in 2014. According to Blue Awakening, the torchlight march is meant to honor those who have fallen for the nation of Estonia and to signify that Estonian youth have not abandoned the nationalist principles. The event has been harshly criticized by the Simon Wiesenthal Center that described it as "Nuremberg-esque" and likened the ideology of the participants to that of the Estonian nazi collaborators.

See also
Candlelight vigil

References

Parades
Street culture
Lantern shows
Christian processions